Ilir Avdyli (born 20 May 1990) is a Kosovar professional footballer who plays as a goalkeeper for KF Llapi.

Club career

Tirana
On 14 January 2016. Avdyli joined Albanian Superliga side Tirana. On 8 May 2016, he made his debut in a 2–1 away defeat against Flamurtari Vlorë after being named in the starting line-up.

Llapi
On 12 July 2016. Avdyli joined Football Superleague of Kosovo side Llapi.

Shkëndija
On 26 June 2017. Avdyli joined Macedonian First Football League side Shkëndija. On 30 December 2017, he left Shkëndija, due to fierce competition.

Kamza
On 4 January 2018. Avdyli joined Albanian Superliga side Kamza, to replace the departed Argjent Halili as the second choice. On 18 March 2018, he made his debut in a 2–0 away defeat against Laçi after being named in the starting line-up.

International career
On 20 May 2014. Avdyli received an urgent call-up from Kosovo for the friendly matches against Turkey and Senegal, to replace the injured Samir Ujkani as the second choice. Avdyli was an unused substitute in these matches.

References

External links

1990 births
Living people
Sportspeople from Podujevo
Association football goalkeepers
Kosovan footballers
KF KEK players
KF Drenica players
KF Ferizaj players
KF Hajvalia players
KF Tirana players
KF Llapi players
KF Shkëndija players
FC Kamza players
FK Kukësi players
KF Feronikeli players
Football Superleague of Kosovo players
Kategoria Superiore players
Macedonian First Football League players
Kosovan expatriate footballers
Expatriate footballers in Albania
Kosovan expatriate sportspeople in Albania
Expatriate footballers in North Macedonia
Kosovan expatriate sportspeople in North Macedonia